Casanare Department is a department in the central eastern region of Colombia.
 
Its capital is Yopal, which is also the episcopal seat of the Roman Catholic Diocese of Yopal.
 
It contains oil fields and an 800 km pipeline leading to the coastal port of Coveñas owned by BP.

Rivers and dams 
The Upía River (Río Upía) is in Casanare.
Casanare, Ariporo, Guachiría, Guanapalo, Pauto, Tocaría, Cravo Sur, Cusiana, Túa y Upía.

History  

A former subregion of Boyacá, Casanare became separate department in 1973.

Municipalities 
 Aguazul
 Chámeza
 Hato Corozal
 La Salina
 Maní
 Monterrey
 Nunchía
 Orocué
 Paz de Ariporo
 Pore
 Recetor
 Sabanalarga
 Sácama
 San Luis de Palenque
 Támara
 Tauramena
 Trinidad
 Villanueva
 Yopal, capital

See also 
 Apostolic Vicariate of Casanare
 Casanare Province (historical)
 Casanare River

References

Sources and external links 
  Government of Casanare official website

 
Departments of Colombia
States and territories established in 1991